Fred Joseph Scolari (March 1, 1922 – October 17, 2002) was an American professional basketball player. At 5'10", he played the point guard position.

Though he was blind in one eye, deaf in one ear and often overweight, "Fat Freddie" excelled in basketball at Galileo High School and the University of San Francisco.  In 1946, he joined the Washington Capitols of the Basketball Association of America (now the NBA) at the start of a nine-year (1946–1955) professional career with the Capitols, Syracuse Nationals, Baltimore Bullets, Fort Wayne Pistons and Boston Celtics. He was one of the last two NBA players who played in its predecessor BAA from its inception in 1946 to retire.

Scolari became known for his unorthodox, yet effective, shooting style, in which he released the ball from his hip. He led the BAA in free-throw percentage for the 1946–47 BAA season. He was also a well-regarded defender, and was voted to the All-BAA Second Team in 1947 and 1948.

After his basketball career ended, he became a successful insurance salesman.  He later served as director of the Salesian Boys and Girls Club in San Francisco. In 1998, he was elected to the Bay Area Sports Hall of Fame.

BAA/NBA career statistics

Regular season

Playoffs

External links

Obituary from San Francisco Chronicle

1922 births
2002 deaths
Amateur Athletic Union men's basketball players
American men's basketball players
Baltimore Bullets (1944–1954) head coaches
Baltimore Bullets (1944–1954) players
Basketball coaches from California
Basketball players from San Francisco
Boston Celtics players
Fort Wayne Pistons players
National Basketball Association All-Stars
Player-coaches
Point guards
San Francisco Dons men's basketball players
Syracuse Nationals players
Washington Capitols players